The Battle of the Shaer gas field was a battle between the Islamic State of Iraq and the Levant (ISIL) and the Syrian government for the control over the Sha'er gas field during the Syrian Civil War. It is the third attack that was launched by ISIL on the gas field.

Offensive 

On 5 May 2016, ISIL once again captured the Shaer gas field that had been held by the Syrian government since the Second Battle of the Shaer gas field. 34 soldiers and 16 ISIL fighters were killed during the battle for the field.

Four days later, ISIL attacked the nearby al-Mahr oil field, capturing al-Mahr hill, before the military recaptured the hill and repelled the attack on the field the following day. The same day, 10 May, ISIL captured an abandoned military base near the T4 airbase, cutting the main supply route to Palmyra. Government troops recaptured the base and reopened the supply road.

Mid-May, there were reports of explosions and a 4.4 Richter magnitude scale  earthquake that was believed to be caused by the entire field blowing up.

On 30 May, government forces recaptured the Huwaysis area.

Aftermath 

In late June, ISIL was once again in control of the Huwaysis area.

In early July, some media activists showed the first photos and videos of the preparation of blasting and explosion.

In September, pro-government forces regained control of the Huwaysis area. but lost it again in a December offensive before recapturing it yet again in early 2017.

See also 
 Battle of the Shaer gas field (July 2014)
 Battle of the Shaer gas field (October–November 2014)

References 

Shaer gas field-3
Shaer gas field-3
Homs Governorate in the Syrian civil war
Shaer gas field 2016
May 2016 events in Syria
Shaer gas field 2016